Love/Knot is a Japanese yaoi manga written and illustrated by Hiroko Ishimaru. It is licensed in North America by Digital Manga Publishing, which released the manga through its imprint June, on 25 February 2009.

Reception
Melinda Beasi appreciated the leads' "warm and consensual" relationship, but felt that the most interesting parts of the story were poorly developed. Rachel Bentham enjoyed the art style. Leroy Dessaroux found the story to be strongly reminiscent of a traditional romance novel. Patricia Beard disliked the characterisation, feeling that the characters were too much like "BL paper dolls", and disliking the softening of the villain, recommending Ishimaru's Total Surrender over Love/Knot.

References

External links

Love/Knot - June Website

Manga series
Yaoi anime and manga
Digital Manga Publishing titles